Holiday Matsuri, or HolMat, is an American multigenre convention that caters primarily to the anime, video gaming, science fiction, and cosplay communities. The convention, which bills itself as a "festively themed" seasonal event, has been held annually in Orlando, Florida, since December 2011. Holiday-themed events that have taken place at the convention include a Holiday Runway Contest, a Holiday Rave, and a Winter Cosplay Crown Contest.

History
The first Holiday Matsuri convention was held at a DoubleTree Hotel managed by Hilton Worldwide in Orlando, Florida, from December 16–18, 2011. The convention also served as a charity event, donating a portion of its profits to Toys for Tots, and hosting a Toys for Tots Benefit Ball wherein attendees could receive admission by donating toys.

The second convention, held from December 14–16, 2012, took place at an Embassy Suites by Hilton hotel in Orlando. The third annual convention took place at the same location from December 13–15, 2013. The fourth annual convention was held at the Caribe Royale in Orlando from December 12–14, 2014. The fifth annual convention again took place at the Caribe Royale, from December 18–20, 2015. The sixth annual convention was held at the Orlando World Center Marriott in December 2016.

The Orlando World Center Marriott again served as the venue for Holiday Matsuri at the convention's seventh annual event, which took place from December 15–17, 2017, as well as its eighth event, which took place from December 14–16, 2018, and its ninth event, held from December 13–15, 2019.

The 2020 Holiday Matsuri convention, which was intended as a celebration of the convention's 10th anniversary, was cancelled as a result of the COVID-19 pandemic. The convention celebrated its 10th anniversary on December 17–19, 2021, at the Orlando World Center Marriott.

References

External links
 

Multigenre conventions
Recurring events established in 2011
2011 establishments in Florida
Anime conventions in the United States
Japanese-American culture in Florida
Conventions in Florida
Fan conventions
Culture of Orlando, Florida